Dan Spătaru (born 24 May 1994) is a Moldovan professional footballer who plays as a winger for Uzbekistan Super League club AGMK.

Club career
In February 2015, Zimbru Chișinău loaned Spătaru to Romanian club Astra Giurgiu, until the end of the 2015–16 season.

He was permanently transferred to Romanian club Dinamo București, on 28 February 2017.

In July 2017, after his contract with Dinamo was terminated, Spătaru signed with another Liga I team: Politehnica Iași, on a two-year deal.

On 29 December 2020, Ararat-Armenia announced the signing of Spătaru on a free-transfer after his FC Noah contract expired. On 9 January 2021, Ararat-Armenia announced that Spătaru had left the club after his contract had expired.
On 1 February 2022, Spătaru returned to FC Noah.

Honours

Zimbru Chișinău 
Moldovan Cup: 2013–14
Moldovan Super Cup: 2014

Dinamo București 
Cupa Ligii: 2016–17

References

Notes

External links
 
 
 
 

1994 births
Living people
Footballers from Chișinău
Moldovan footballers
Moldova international footballers
Association football midfielders
Moldovan Super Liga players
FC Zimbru Chișinău players
FC Astra Giurgiu players
FC Dinamo București players
FC Politehnica Iași (2010) players
FK Liepāja players
FC Nizhny Novgorod (2015) players
FC Noah players
FC Ararat-Armenia players
Latvian Higher League players
Liga I players
Armenian Premier League players
Russian First League players
Moldovan expatriate footballers
Expatriate footballers in Romania
Moldovan expatriate sportspeople in Romania
Expatriate footballers in Russia
Moldovan expatriate sportspeople in Russia
Expatriate footballers in Armenia
Moldovan expatriate sportspeople in Armenia